Volodymyr Petrovych Khomenko (born 26 July 1954, in Cheremoshne, Pohrebyshche Raion, Ukraine), is a Ukrainian politician.

In 2007 he served as a Presidential representative of Ukraine in Crimea.

References

External links
 Main "anti-corruptionist of "Front of Change" Khomenko was "covering up" conservatives? (Главный «антикоррупционер» «Фронта перемен» Хоменко «крышевал» конвертаторов?) Bagnet. 3 August 2010.
 Liamets, S. Volodymyr Khomenko: I do not bluff (Володимир Хоменко: Я не блефую). Ukrayinska Pravda (Ekonomichna Pravda). 14 May 2014.
 Bolotny, I. New "klimenki" and old "kivalovi" again in line (Новые "клименки" и старые "киваловы" снова в строю). Mirror Weekly. 16 May 2014

1954 births
Living people
People from Vinnytsia Oblast
Kiev National Transportation University alumni
Presidential representatives of Ukraine in Crimea